Roy Hawksley (birth registered first ¼ 1942) is an English former professional rugby league footballer who played in the 1960s and 1970s.

Background
Roy Hawksley's birth was registered in Wakefield district, West Riding of Yorkshire, England.

Playing career

County Cup Final appearances
Roy Hawksley played  in Salford's 7-16 defeat by Widnes in the 1975–76 Lancashire County Cup Final during the 1975–76 season at Central Park, Wigan on Saturday 4 October 1975.

Player's No.6 Trophy Final appearances
Roy Hawksley played  in Halifax's 22-11 victory over Wakefield Trinity in the 1971–72 Player's No.6 Trophy Final during the 1971–72 season at Odsal Stadium, Bradford on Saturday 22 January 1972.

Club career
Roy Hawksley made his début for Wakefield Trinity during January 1961, and he played his last match for Wakefield Trinity during the 1965–66 season

Contemporaneous Article Extract
"Outlines - Roy Hawksley - Signed last season, Roy is a promising young  who should eventually fare extremely well in the game. Indeed his present skills may well be judged by his past records. For our own Trinity juniors he did grand work before joining the senior club, whilst he had previously been a member of the highly successful Snapethorpe School side which carried all before it a few years ago in heading the Wakefield Schools’ League and winning the Yorkshire Cup. Whilst at school he also had the honour of playing for the Wakefield City team and for Yorkshire County, always as  Whilst his scrum play is outstanding he is also quite active in the open. At the age of 19 he still has time to develop physically and should have a most satisfying career. Height, 5 ft. 9in., weight, 13 stones."

Genealogical information
Roy Hawksley's marriage to Gwendoline (née Turner) was registered during first ¼ 1963 in Wakefield district. They had children; Mark Hawksley (birth registered during first ¼  in Wakefield district)

References

External links
Search for "Hawksley" at rugbyleagueproject.org

1942 births
Living people
Doncaster R.L.F.C. players
English rugby league players
Halifax R.L.F.C. players
Rugby league players from Wakefield
Rugby league hookers
Salford Red Devils players
Wakefield Trinity players